Daniel Wells (born 3 February 1985) is a former professional Australian rules footballer who played for North Melbourne and Collingwood in the Australian Football League (AFL).

AFL career

He rose to prominence in 2004 when, against Fremantle, he kicked the AFL Goal of the Year, jumping and taking the ball from ruck contest in the goal square and kicking the goal before he landed.

Wells was selected in the Australian team for the 2005 International Rules Series but was unable to play due to injury.
He enjoyed a fairly good year in 2006 in which he averaged 18 disposals and finished 2nd in the Syd Barker Medal.

In 2008, Wells enjoyed a good season averaging 21 disposals and having a big impact in matches in the second half of the season during North Melbourne's winning period.  He was rewarded with selection in the Australian side that lost to Ireland in that year's International Rules Series.

2009 was a disappointing year for Wells when injuries restricted him to just 7 games.

In 2011 Wells produced a brilliant and consistent season when he won his first Syd Barker Medal which he shared with Andrew Swallow. He would also be named in the 40 man All Australian squad but would miss out on being part of the final 22.

Following the 2013 season, the two-time best and fairest was chosen to represent Australia in the International Rules Series as captain of the exclusively Indigenous team, a rare and memorable honour.

At the conclusion of the 2016 season, Wells announced his intentions to leave North Melbourne as a free agent and he signed with Collingwood as an unrestricted free agent in October.

On 24 May 2017, it was announced that he would wear number 67 on his guernsey, rather than his usual 3, for the round 10 Sir Doug Nicholls Indigenous Round game against . This was to commemorate the 1967 referendum (which allowed Indigenous Australians to be counted with the general population in the census).

Wells retired in September 2019.

Statistics
 Statistics are correct to the end of the 2019 season

|- style="background-color: #eaeaea"
! scope="row" style="text-align:center" | 2003
|style="text-align:center;"|
| 8 || 18 || 10 || 7 || 149 || 67 || 216 || 64 || 39 || 0.6 || 0.4 || 8.3 || 3.7 || 12.0 || 3.6 || 2.2
|-
! scope="row" style="text-align:center" | 2004
|style="text-align:center;"|
| 8 || 22 || 13 || 8 || 239 || 114 || 353 || 89 || 49 || 0.6 || 0.4 || 10.9 || 5.2 || 16.0 || 4.0 || 2.2
|- style="background-color: #eaeaea"
! scope="row" style="text-align:center" | 2005
|style="text-align:center;"|
| 8 || 22 || 12 || 10 || 246 || 148 || 394 || 86 || 43 || 0.5 || 0.5 || 11.2 || 6.7 || 17.9 || 3.9 || 2.0
|-
! scope="row" style="text-align:center" | 2006
|style="text-align:center;"|
| 8 || 22 || 11 || 7 || 227 || 180 || 407 || 81 || 53 || 0.5 || 0.3 || 10.3 || 8.2 || 18.5 || 3.7 || 2.4
|- style="background-color: #eaeaea"
! scope="row" style="text-align:center" | 2007
|style="text-align:center;"|
| 8 || 18 || 14 || 18 || 193 || 139 || 332 || 70 || 44 || 0.8 || 1.0 || 10.7 || 7.7 || 18.4 || 3.9 || 2.4
|-
! scope="row" style="text-align:center" | 2008
|style="text-align:center;"|
| 8 || 21 || 6 || 11 || 271 || 173 || 444 || 92 || 59 || 0.3 || 0.5 || 12.9 || 8.2 || 21.1 || 4.4 || 2.8
|- style="background-color: #eaeaea"
! scope="row" style="text-align:center" | 2009
|style="text-align:center;"|
| 8 || 7 || 4 || 1 || 94 || 41 || 135 || 30 || 13 || 0.6 || 0.1 || 13.4 || 5.9 || 19.3 || 4.3 || 1.9
|-
! scope="row" style="text-align:center" | 2010
|style="text-align:center;"|
| 8 || 19 || 15 || 11 || 246 || 150 || 396 || 90 || 43 || 0.8 || 0.6 || 12.9 || 7.9 || 20.8 || 4.7 || 2.3
|- style="background-color: #eaeaea"
! scope="row" style="text-align:center" | 2011
|style="text-align:center;"|
| 8 || 21 || 17 || 15 || 312 || 180 || 492 || 80 || 80 || 0.8 || 0.7 || 14.9 || 8.6 || 23.4 || 3.8 || 3.8
|-
! scope="row" style="text-align:center" | 2012
|style="text-align:center;"|
| 8 || 20 || 14 || 16 || 290 || 149 || 439 || 72 || 59 || 0.7 || 0.8 || 14.5 || 7.5 || 22.0 || 3.6 || 3.0
|- style="background-color: #eaeaea"
! scope="row" style="text-align:center" | 2013
|style="text-align:center;"|
| 8 || 22 || 25 || 10 || 291 || 177 || 468 || 80 || 52 || 1.1 || 0.5 || 13.2 || 8.0 || 21.3 || 3.6 || 2.4
|-
! scope="row" style="text-align:center" | 2014
|style="text-align:center;"|
| 8 || 10 || 4 || 4 || 100 || 87 || 187 || 39 || 25 || 0.4 || 0.4 || 10.0 || 8.7 || 18.7 || 3.9 || 2.5
|- style="background-color: #eaeaea"
! scope="row" style="text-align:center" | 2015
|style="text-align:center;"|
| 8 || 2 || 0 || 0 || 6 || 16 || 22 || 1 || 6 || 0.0 || 0.0 || 3.0 || 8.0 || 11.0 || 0.5 || 3.0
|-
! scope="row" style="text-align:center" | 2016
|style="text-align:center;"|
| 8 || 19 || 5 || 5 || 224 || 215 || 439 || 67 || 82 || 0.3 || 0.3 || 11.8 || 11.3 || 23.1 || 3.5 || 4.3
|- style="background-color: #eaeaea"
! scope="row" style="text-align:center" | 2017
|style="text-align:center;"|
| 3/67 || 10 || 11 || 5 || 101 || 84 || 185 || 47 || 22 || 1.1 || 0.5 || 10.1 || 8.4 || 18.5 || 4.7 || 2.2
|- 
! scope="row" style="text-align:center" | 2018
|style="text-align:center;"|
| 3 || 4 || 2 || 4 || 32 || 18 || 50 || 14 || 10 || 0.5 || 1.0 || 8.0 || 4.5 || 12.5 || 3.5 || 2.5
|- style="background-color: #eaeaea"
! scope="row" style="text-align:center" | 2019
|style="text-align:center;"|
| 3 || 1 || 3 || 0 || 6 || 5 || 11 || 4 || 2 || 3.0 || 0.0 || 6.0 || 5.0 || 11.0 || 4.0 || 2.0
|- class="sortbottom"
! colspan=3| Career
! 258
! 166
! 132
! 3027
! 1943
! 4970
! 1006
! 681
! 0.6
! 0.5
! 11.7
! 7.5
! 19.3
! 3.9
! 2.6
|}

Health scare
At the end of the 2011 season Wells had shoulder surgery during which it was discovered that he had a large blood clot on his lungs. The clot was successfully removed and Wells returned to full health and resumed playing.

Media profile and personal life
In 2007, Wells appeared in a television advertisement for AFL on the Gold Coast and in 2009 and he featured in the official advertisement for the AFL, playing Australian Rules on an Association Football ground.

He is a devout Roman Catholic.

On 14 October 2006 Wells married school teacher Mariangela Laudato. They have a daughter, Laudate Angelus.

References

External links 

1985 births
Living people
Indigenous Australian players of Australian rules football
North Melbourne Football Club players
Peel Thunder Football Club players
Australian rules footballers from Western Australia
Australian Roman Catholics
People from Mandurah
Syd Barker Medal winners
North Ballarat Football Club players
Collingwood Football Club players
Australia international rules football team players